José Rolando de León (born 1950) is a Guatemalan paralympic weightlifter. At the age of 10 months he contracted polio.
He competed at the 1976 Summer Paralympics and 1988 Summer Paralympics, being awarded gold and bronze medals in weightlifting.

References

External links 

1950 births
Living people
Guatemalan male weightlifters
Weightlifters at the 1976 Summer Paralympics
Weightlifters at the 1988 Summer Paralympics
Medalists at the 1976 Summer Paralympics
Medalists at the 1988 Summer Paralympics
Paralympic medalists in weightlifting
People with polio
20th-century Guatemalan people